The president of the Republic of Bulgaria is the head of state of Bulgaria and the commander-in-chief of the Bulgarian Army. The official residence of the president is at Boyana Residence, Sofia. After the completion of the second round of voting, candidate Rumen Radev was elected President of Bulgaria on 13 November 2016.

In Bulgaria, the president's role is primarily as a symbolic figure, with the main function being to be the 'arbitrator' of disputes between Bulgaria's different institutions. They are not considered head of government or part of the nation's executive power. However, in the absence of a prime minister, presidents are in charge of appointing an interim administration, giving them considerable influence over the government during such periods (Zhelyu Zhelev in 1994-95; Petar Stoyanov in 1997; Rosen Plevneliev in 2013 and 2014; and Rumen Radev in 2017, 2021, and since 2022). On some occasions, the president has appointed the prime minister as well.  The president is elected for a five-year term, which is renewable only once. After an individual has served two terms as president, that individual will forever be barred from being elected to the presidency again under the rules set out by Bulgaria's Constitution. The president addresses the nation on national television annually on New Year's Eve, just moments before the start of the new year.

Election

Eligibility for election 
For a Bulgarian citizen to be able to run for the office of President of Bulgaria, they must fulfil the following conditions:

Must be a Bulgarian citizen 
Must be at least 40 years old
Must have lived in Bulgaria for the five years prior to the candidacy
Must fulfil all conditions that would be required for election as a representative to Bulgaria's National Assembly

Electoral system 
The president is elected directly by the Bulgarian people in a two-round majoritarian election. If a candidate manages to obtain more than 50% of the vote and the voter turnout was at least 50% in the first round, that candidate is elected. If no candidate manages to obtain more than 50% of the vote or the voter turnout was lower than 50% in the first round, then the two top-performing candidates face off in a second round with first-past-the-post voting, with the candidate receiving the larger number of votes considered elected.

Restrictions 
The president is banned from also being a member of the National Assembly, as well taking on any other government, public or private offices for the duration of his term. The president is also constitutionally forbidden from being involved in a leadership position of a political party while in office. In practice, despite the fact that most candidates for president are elected from a political party's list and despite the fact that the Constitution doesn't forbid the president from being an ordinary member of a political party, it is widely expected in Bulgarian society that the president-elect renounce all affiliations with political parties once elected and serve as an independent politician.

Powers and privileges
The president of Bulgaria has a number of functions and powers that are regulated in Chapter 4 of the 1991 Constitution of Bulgaria. The president is elected directly by a popular vote for a period of five years which is renewable.

Presidential powers 
The following powers belong to the president of Bulgaria:

The ability to give, restore or revoke Bulgarian citizenship, as well as refugee status.
Appoint and dismiss senior government officials
Exercise the right to pardon convicted criminals, as well as forgive 'uncollectible' debts owed to the government
Rename villages, towns and cities, as well as objects of national importance
Act as Supreme commander-in-chief of the Bulgarian Armed Forces
Represent Bulgaria at home and abroad
Schedule the National and local elections within the intervals designated by law
Veto any bill coming from the National Assembly by refusing to sign it after its passage in the assembly.
Declares war, martial law or any other state of emergency (This is done with the assistance of the Consultative Council on National Security)
Grant and award the orders, decorations, and medals of Bulgaria

Immunity 
The president enjoys blanket legal immunity during his tenure and is not held responsible for any act performed while on duty, with the exception of treason or violation of the Bulgarian constitution. His authority may only be stripped via impeachment and may not be removed by any other institution. The president cannot be detained and may not be prosecuted.

Vice president 

The president is assisted in these duties by the vice president of Bulgaria. The vice president replaces the president in case of absence. Only upon early termination of office of the vice president will assume the duties of president until elections are held. The Constitution permits the president to delegate to the vice president the powers to appoint and dismiss certain officials, issue pardons and amnesty, provide citizenship and refugee status, but does not allow the president to delegate any of his other powers., enjoys the same privileges of immunity as the president and can only be dismissed from his office under the same procedures as those regarding the president.

Termination of office
According to the constitution, the mandate of the president is completed if and when:

The presidential term expires 
The president resigns before the Constitutional Court 
The president is permanently unable to perform his/her duties due to serious illness
The president dies while in office
The president is impeached

Impeachment 
Impeachment can only begin if the president has committed treason or has violated the Constitution of Bulgaria. Impeachment starts after at least a quarter of the members of the National Assembly deposit an accusatory act before the assembly. The act must then be approved by a supermajority of 2/3 of all elected representatives in order to be accepted. If accepted, the case is referred to the Constitutional Court of Bulgaria, which must decide within a one-month time span whether or not the president is guilty of the crime he has been accused of by the Assembly. If the constitutional court finds that the president has committed treason or violated the constitution, as per the accusatory act, then the president is considered successfully impeached and is stripped of his authority.

Bulgarian presidential line of succession

1. Vice President of Bulgaria
2. Chairman of the National Assembly
3. Prime Minister of Bulgaria

Latest election

See also

Government of Bulgaria
History of Bulgaria
Politics of Bulgaria
Corruption in Bulgaria
List of heads of state of Bulgaria
List of presidents of Bulgaria (1990-present)
List of Bulgarian monarchs
Prime Minister of Bulgaria
List of prime ministers of Bulgaria

Notes

References

External links

 President of the Republic of Bulgaria

Bulgaria
 

1990 establishments in Bulgaria